Yarra is a locality in the Goulburn Mulwaree Council, New South Wales, Australia. It is located about 18 km southwest of Goulburn, 84 km northeast of Canberra and 213 km southwest of Sydney. It lies at the intersection of the Federal Highway and the Hume Highway. Yarra railway station was a station on the Main Southern railway line from 1875 to the 1970s. A small settlement grew up around the railway station and the Hume Highway, parts of which were demolished during road widening in the 1970s. It had a public school from 1869 to 1970, operating as a "half-time" school until 1873.

References

Localities in New South Wales
Southern Tablelands
Goulburn Mulwaree Council
Hume Highway